Adam's Family Tree is a children's television comedy programme that was first broadcast in January 1997 and ran until February 1999. The show was broadcast on CITV, the children's segment of ITV. The show which was filmed in Yorkshire ran for three series and 20 episodes.

The premise of the show was that 12-year-old Adam was able to call upon his ancestors from throughout history to help him solve everyday problems. The title character was played by Anthony Lewis for the first two series, before the role was taken over by Alex Cooke.

Cast
Anthony Lewis as Adam (series 1–2)
Alex Cooke as Adam (series 3)
Samia Ghadie as Jane (series 1–2)
Lauren Brown as Jane (series 3)
Jacqueline Naylor as Adam's mother
Bill Speed as Adam's father
Kate Dove as Mrs Copstick
Judith Davis as Mrs Rocket
John Biggins as Mr Blah
Mark Hearne as Browny
Shane Bullers as Whitey
Alex Carter as Greeny
Richard Finn as Geoff (Purpley)

Episodes

Series 1 (1997)

Series 2 (1998)

Series 3 (1999)

See also 
List of programmes broadcast by CITV

References

External links 

1997 British television series debuts
1999 British television series endings
1990s British children's television series
ITV children's television shows
Television series by Yorkshire Television
Television series by ITV Studios
ITV comedy
English-language television shows
British children's fantasy television series